The L-W-F Model H Owl was a large American twin-boom trimotor biplane designed and built by LWF Engineering as a mail plane in 1920, but after being rejected for that role, the single prototype was sold to the United States Army Air Service for evaluation as a bomber but failed to secure any orders.

Design and development
It had a center nacelle with room for three crew members suspended on struts between the wings and flanked on either side by similarly braced tail booms. All three fuselages had a Liberty L-12  engine in the nose, and were fabricated from laminated wood in the same manner as had been used in prior LWF fuselage designs, with three thin layers of wood laid at an angle to each other and separated with fabric. 
The four bay biplane wings were fitted with ailerons on both upper and lower wings.
It had a biplane horizontal stabilizer with three rudders, and ailerons on all four wings. No fin was provided for the center rudder. All controls were given generous aerodynamic counterbalances to reduce control forces. The initial six-wheel undercarriage was later modified to four-wheels, and the radiator for the center engine was moved from in front of the pilot to between the engine and the propeller.

Operational history

The Owl was first flown by Ernest Harmon from Mitchel Field, on Long Island, New York, on 22 May 1920. 

Although built for night air mail service (hence being named Owl), it failed to interest the Post Office.

Between 1921 and 1922, the United States Army Air Service evaluated it as a bomber at Langley Field in Virginia when it was allocated Army Air Service serial number 64012, however its performance was described as “adequate but not impressive.”
The sole prototype was scrapped in 1923. Two prototypes of the XNBS-2, a scaled-down twin-engine derivative of the Owl, were ordered in 1923, but this order was cancelled before construction began.

Variants
Model H Owl biplane mailplane/bomber, one built.
NBS-2 Scaled down twin-engined version. Order for two cancelled and none built.

Operators
 United States Army Air Service

Specifications (model H Owl)

See also

References

Citations

Bibliography

L-W-F aircraft
1920s United States bomber aircraft
Biplanes
Aircraft first flown in 1920
Trimotors